Kbox or K-box may refer to:

Products
 kBox, an exercise device
 K-box, an audio speaker
 KBox, a brand of computer products by KACE Networks; See List of products based on FreeBSD

Radio stations
 KBOX, a Lompoc, California, US radio station
 KNGO, a radio station (1480 AM) licensed to serve Dallas, Texas, United States, which held the call sign KBOX from 1958 to 1989